The 34th Street station was an express station on the demolished IRT Ninth Avenue Line in Manhattan, New York City. It was originally built on July 30, 1873 by the New York Elevated Railroad Company, and had two levels. The lower level was built first and had two tracks and two side platforms. The upper level was built as part of the Dual Contracts and had one track and two side platforms over the lower level local tracks. It closed on June 11, 1940. This station also serviced Penn Station and was west of the IRT and IND subway stations at Penn Station.

History
In April 1930, a new stairway at the station was opened to the northeast corner of Ninth Avenue and 34th Street.

References

IRT Ninth Avenue Line stations
Railway stations in the United States opened in 1873
Railway stations closed in 1940
Former elevated and subway stations in Manhattan
34th Street (Manhattan)